William Ogg may refer to:
Sir William Gammie Ogg (1891–1979), British horticultural scientist
William L. Ogg,  Ohio politician